Zhigalov or Žigalov is a Russian masculine surname, its feminine counterpart is Zhigalova or Žigalova. It may refer to
Aleksey Zhigalov (1915–1963), Russian diver
Lyubov Zhigalova (1924–1978), Russian diver, wife of Aleksey
Marietta Žigalová (born 1968), Slovak fitness competitor
Mikhail Zhigalov (born 1942), Russian actor 

Russian-language surnames